Milan Knížák (born 19 April 1940) is a Czech performance artist, sculptor, noise musician, installation artist, political dissident, graphic artist, art theorist and pedagogue of art associated with Fluxus.

Biography

Childhood and early life in the Protectorate and in the former Sudetenland (1940–1960)
Milan Knizak is the son of the painter, musician and teacher of mathematics Karel Knížák from Doubravka u Plzně, nowadays part of the town Plzeň, and Julia Knížáková. The parents taught in Jarov (1932–1934) and later in Blovice close to Pilsen. Milan Knížák was born in Plzeň on 19 April 1940. In 1945, after the expulsion of Germans from Czechoslovakia the family moved to the Mariánské Lázně, a spa town in the former Sudetenland, close to the German border. There, his father played violin in a spa orchestra and Milan attended primary school, where he was interested in music and literature. He also took piano, trumpet and guitar lessons.

Studies and beginnings (1955–1965) 
Knížák started painting at fourteen in Mariánské Lázně where his first exhibition was held in 1958. He attended secondary/high-school (Gymnasium in Planá u Mariánských Lázní) and graduated in 1957. On several occasions young Knížák visited the studio of the painter Vladimír Modrý (1907–1976). Later Knížák wrote in his diary about the movie Fantastic Voyage and how its fantastic scenes reminded him of the paintings of Modrý. During the period of mid-1957 to 1958 he attended the Pedagogical University in Prague, majoring in art education and Russian language. In 1958 he dropped out and became an assistant worker at Prague's exhibition grounds. He later passed the exams at the Academy of Fine Arts in Prague, but soon abandoned his studies there. He then studied mathematical analysis at the Faculty of Mathematics and Physics, Charles University for one year.

Actual and public art (1960–1975) 
At the beginning of the 1960s, he created his first activity – happenings, ceremonies, installations and various environments on the busy or calm streets or in courtyards of Prague.

Together with his friends he founded a group of contemporary art called Actual Art. Sometime around 1966 the word "art" was dropped from the name and group was called poor AKTUAL. Already known and also documented are their actions in the part of old Prague called New World, such as Demonstration of One (1964). Some of AKTUAL's songs were remastered by unofficial musical group The Plastic People of the Universe, which members became, somewhat against their will, dissidents during political process in the autumn of the year 1976.

Knížák was a member of Fluxus, an international (anti-)artistic community of music, actions, poetry, objects and events. Knížák was director of Fluxus East from the year 1965. He is known for organising and performing the first happenings and noise music concerts in Czechoslovakia: e.g. A Walk around Novy Svět (The part of old Prague called New World) and the Demonstration for Oneself (both 1964). Later he had contacts with the first contact mediated Czech philosopher Jindřich Chalupecký. Knížák was promoted to Director Fluxus East by director George Maciunas about 1965.  In the countries of former Eastern Bloc there were managed these activities: The Fluxus Festivals in Vilnius (1966), Prague (1966), Budapest (1969), and Poznań (1977). Knížák was also visited by American beatnik poet Allen Ginsberg and conceptual art artist Joseph Kosuth.

George Maciunas invited Knížák to the United States in 1965 and he participated in Fluxus events there. He realized his Lying Ceremony in New Brunswick and the Difficult Ceremony in New York City. Maciunas prepared the publication of Knížák's Collected Works as a Fluxus Edition. 

In October 1966, Knížák organised the first Fluxus concert in Czechoslovakia in Prague in which he appeared together with Ben Vautier, Jeff Berner, Alison Knowles, Serge Oldenbourg and Dick Higgins.

Knížák returned to Czechoslovakia in 1970. His works were exhibited in the galleries in the East bloc, f.e. Kraków in Poland, Budapest in Hungary, but also in capitalistic Austria. In 1979 he received a fellowship from the DAAD to West Berlin, where he meet artist Wolf Vostell and Czech poet in emigration Jiří Kolář. In West Berlin he worked as a designer on an avant-garde film and created the automobile cycle of collages for Volkswagen.

Political activities 
During the communist era Knížák was under police surveillance and was called an Enemy of the State. He was arrested during an event with the music band The Plastic People of the Universe.

Awards and positions 
In 1998 Knížák unsuccessfully ran for the Senate as an independent, supported by the ODS/. In 2010 he was awarded the Medal of Merit by the Czech Republic. Knížák was director of the Czech National Gallery in Prague between 1999 and 2011.

Pedagogy
Milan Knížák is a professor of intermedia at the Academy of Fine Arts in Prague since 1990. His pupils have included Jana Šindelová.
 1998: École cantonale d'art de Lausanne (ECAL), Lausanne, Switzerland – lectures, lecture on history of performance art
 1997: Centre Georges Pompidou, Domaine de Boisbuchet, France – extension and pedagogy
 1991, 1992: Vitra Museum, Weil am Rhein, BRD – lectures
 1991: Sommerakademie Berlin, BRD – pedagogy
 1990 -1997: Academy of Fine Arts in Prague, chancellor and professor of intermedia
 since 1989: professor of intermedia at the Academy of Fine Arts in Prague
 1987, 1990, 1993, 1996: Inter. Sommerakademie Salzburg, Rakousko – pedagogy and lectures
 1983: HfBK Hamburg, BRD – lectures on art
 1969: University of Kentucky, Lexington, USA + UCLA, Los Angeles, USA – lectures on performance art

Awards
 1997 Medal of first instance of the Ministry of Education
 2010 He became the holder of the Medal of Merit

Selected Knížák Fluxus Event Specification
 1965 Fashion specification: Cut a coat along its entire length. Wear each half separately.
 1965 Cat specification: Get a cat.
 1965–1970 Killing the Books specification: By shooting, by burning, by drowning, by cutting, by gluing, by painting white, or red, or black...
 1968 Lying Ceremony specification: Blindfolded people lie on the ground for a long time.

Notes

References
 Milan Knížák's books: Amazon.com: Milan Knizak: Books
 Milan Knížák on artlist: Milan Knížák – Artlist – databáze současného umění

External links

 Archivio Conz
 Artnotart.com
 Milan Knizak opens solo exhibition at Manes Gallery – Czech Radio
 Videoreports with Milan Knížák on Artycok.TV

1940 births
Living people
Artists from Plzeň
Czech poets
Czech male poets
Writers from Plzeň
Recipients of Medal of Merit (Czech Republic)
Academy of Fine Arts, Prague alumni